Llawa P'ukru (Quechua llawa broken glass with sharp edges, p'ukru hole, pit, gap in a surface, Hispanicized spelling Llaguapucro) is a mountain in the Andes of Peru, about  high. It is situated in the Lima Region, Huarochirí Province, Chicla District. Llawa P'ukru lies southwest of Sillaqaqa and Inka Kancha, east of Qunchupata and southeast of Quriqucha.

References

Mountains of Peru
Mountains of Lima Region